The following lists events in the year 2010 in Hungary.

Incumbents
President: László Sólyom (until 5 August), Pál Schmitt (from 6 August)
Prime Minister: Gordon Bajnai (until 29 May), Viktor Orbán (from 29 May)
Speaker of the National Assembly: Béla Katona (until 13 May), Pál Schmitt (14 May–5 August), László Kövér (from 6 August)

Events

 4 October – Ajka alumina plant accident

Deaths

 4 January – György Mitró, Olympic swimmer (b. 1930).
 7 January – Sándor Barcs, politician and sports executive (b. 1912).
 17 January – Béla Köpeczi, historian and politician (b. 1920).
 20 March – István Bilek, chess grandmaster (b. 1932).
 29 March – János Kass, artist (b. 1927).
 2 April – Dávid Daróczi, journalist (b. 1972).
 8 April – Aladár Kovácsi, Olympic modern pentathlete (b. 1932).
 9 April – Zoltán Varga, footballer (b. 1945).
 17 April – Ferenc Kellner, Olympic boxer (b. 1932).
 19 April – György Schwajda, dramatist and theatre director (b. 1943).
 19 April – Albert Szatola, Olympic equestrian (b. 1927).
 8 May – Andor Lilienthal, chess grandmaster (b. 1911).
 28 July – István Móna, Olympic modern pentathlete (b. 1940).
 4 September – Kálmán Kulcsár, politician and jurist (b. 1928).
 14 September – Kálmán Tolnai, Olympic sailor (b. 1924).
 17 September – András Harangvölgyi, Olympic skier (b. 1923).
 19 September – László Polgár, opera singer (b. 1947).
 1 October – Dezső Bundzsák, footballer (b. 1928).
 15 October – Vera Rózsa, singer and voice teacher (b. 1917).
 31 October – János Simon, basketball player (b. 1929).
 8 November – András Ádám-Stolpa, tennis, basketball and ice hockey player (b. 1921).
 10 November – Attila Kovács, Olympic fencer (b. 1939).
 15 November – Imre Polyák, Olympic Greco-Roman wrestler (b. 1932).
 30 November – Imre Sátori, footballer (b. 1937).
 6 December – Ferenc Keszthelyi, Bishop of the Roman Catholic Diocese of Vác (b. 1928).
 6 December – Imre Mathesz, footballer (b. 1937).

See also
List of Hungarian films since 1990

References

 
2010s in Hungary
Years of the 21st century in Hungary
Hungary
Hungary